The TIGR Plant Transcript Assemblies database in computational biology is a repository of sequences collected for the construction of transcript assemblies.

See also
 TIGR plant repeat database

References

External links
 http://plantta.tigr.org

Biological databases